Cuba is one of four of the world's independent countries that do not have Scouting; however, Scouting and Guiding in Cuba was served by

 Asociación de Guías de Cuba, former member of the World Association of Girl Guides and Girl Scouts
 Asociación de Scouts de Cuba, former member of the World Organization of the Scout Movement

See also